Mim lake, originally known as the Anwomasu Lake, is an Inland lake located on the outskirts of Mim in the Asunafo North Municipal District in the Ahafo Region of Ghana.
The lake is a latent tourist site and  has the potential of a lake Resort.
Revellers often visit it for leisure.

Geography
Mim lake at  lies off the Mim - kenyasi road, about  northwards of the Mim township. The main communities around this lake are the Mim old-airport quarters, Asukese, and Nkensere.

History
This man-made lake is an expansion of the old Anwomasu river which was created initially as a dam for industrial and domestic purposes.

With the new dam serving both industrial and domestic purposes, the old dam with its diverse natural scenes, was turned into tourist attraction. The Lake has different species of flora and fauna. Among the fish species in the lake are the endemic cichlid hemichromis frempongi, and the near-endemic cichlids tilapia busumana and T. discolor.

Incidents
There have been a couple of separate incidents when two people, aged 57 and 31 years, on different occasions drowned in the lake.

References

Lakes of Ghana
Ahafo Region
Tourist attractions in Ghana